Sagharan-e Olya (also Romanized as Sāgharān-e ‘Olyā, Sagharan Olya, and Sāqarān-e ‘Olyā; also known as Sāgharān-e Bālā, Sāgharī-ye ‘Olyā, Sāqarān, Sāqarān-e Bālā, Saran, and Sāqerān-e Bālā) is a village in Abgarm Rural District, Abgarm District, Avaj County, Qazvin Province, Iran. At the 2006 census, its population was 367, in 99 families.

References 

Populated places in Avaj County